Tactusa biartus is a moth of the family Erebidae first described by Michael Fibiger in 2010. It is known from northern Thailand.

The wingspan is about 11 mm. The forewing is relatively short and narrow. The ground colour is yellowish, with a basal-costal patch and dorsomedial, triangular patch. It is yellowish between the basal and antemedial lines, and between the triangular patch and the subterminal line. The subterminal and terminal areas, including the fringes, are blackish brown, except for the beige costal patch. The subterminal line is indicated and white, while the terminal line weakly marked. The hindwing is whitish, with an indistinct discal spot and the underside is unicolorous grey.

References

Micronoctuini
Taxa named by Michael Fibiger
Moths described in 2010